Jung In-whan ( born December 15, 1986) is a South Korean football player who plays as a central defender.

Youth career 
He started his youth career as the football player in Baeam Highschool placed in Yongin city.

Club career

Henan Jianye 
On 28 February 2015, Jung joined the Chinese Super League club Henan Jianye.

International career
During his high school time, he was selected for the South Korean under-20 team and appeared at the 2004 AFC Youth Championship.

He debuted for the senior team on 15 August 2012 in a friendly match against Zambia.

References

 K-League 2012 Award
 K-League Team Record in Korean
 Mr. Jung In-Whan's Interview after the match versus Zambia

External links
 
 
 
 

1986 births
Living people
Yonsei University alumni
South Korean footballers
South Korea under-17 international footballers
South Korea under-20 international footballers
South Korea under-23 international footballers
South Korea international footballers
Association football defenders
Jeonbuk Hyundai Motors players
Jeonnam Dragons players
Incheon United FC players
Henan Songshan Longmen F.C. players
FC Seoul players
K League 1 players
Chinese Super League players
South Korean expatriate footballers
Expatriate footballers in China
South Korean expatriate sportspeople in China
Footballers at the 2006 Asian Games
Asian Games competitors for South Korea